Romelu Lukaku Bolingoli (born 13 May 1993) is a Belgian professional footballer who plays as a striker for  club Inter Milan, on loan from  club Chelsea, and the Belgium national team.

Lukaku began his senior club career playing for Anderlecht, where he won a Belgian Pro League title and finished as the league's top goalscorer. In 2011, he joined Chelsea in a transfer worth £10 million (€12 million), but limited playing time resulted in loans to West Bromwich Albion and Everton; in 2014, Lukaku signed with Everton in a then club-record transfer worth £28 million (€32 million), going on to finish as the league's second-top goalscorer. He subsequently signed with Manchester United in a transfer worth £75 million (€88 million), but after a breakdown in relations with the club, Lukaku departed for Inter Milan in 2019 in a club-record deal worth €80 million (£68.1 million), and won a Serie A title and Serie A Most Valuable Player.

In 2021, Lukaku returned to Chelsea in a club-record transfer worth £97.5 million (€115 million), becoming the seventh-most expensive player, the most expensive Belgian player, and the most expensive player of all time with reference to cumulative transfer fees.

Belgium's all-time top goalscorer, Lukaku made his senior international debut in 2010, and has represented his country at five major tournaments: the 2016 and 2020 UEFA European Championships and the 2014, 2018 and 2022 FIFA World Cups; he finished as joint second-highest goalscorer to win the Bronze Boot in 2018.

Club career

Early career
Lukaku joined his local team Rupel Boom at age five. After four seasons at Rupel Boom, Lukaku was discovered by scouts of Lierse, a Belgian Pro League club with an established youth academy. He played for Lierse from 2004 until 2006, scoring 121 goals in 68 matches. After Lierse were relegated from the Belgian Pro League, Anderlecht purchased 13 youth players from Lierse in the 2006 mid-season, including Lukaku. He played three more years as a youth player with Anderlecht, scoring 131 goals in 93 matches.

Anderlecht
When Lukaku turned 16 on 13 May 2009, he signed a professional contract with Anderlecht lasting until 2012. Eleven days later, he made his Belgian First Division debut on 24 May 2009 in the championship play-off match against Standard Liège as a 69th-minute substitute for defender Víctor Bernárdez. Anderlecht lost the match 1–0. Lukaku became a regular member of Anderlecht's first team during the 2009–10 season, scoring his first goal at senior level against Zulte Waregem in the 89th minute after coming on as substitute for Kanu on 28 August 2009. "After scoring I dived into a sea of happiness," he told Berend Scholten from UEFA.com. "You think you are flying and can take on the whole world." He ended the season as the top goalscorer in the Pro League with 15 goals as Anderlecht won its 30th Belgian title. He also scored four goals during the club's run to the last 16 of the 2009–10 UEFA Europa League. During the 2010–11 season, Lukaku scored 20 goals in all competitions, but Anderlecht failed to retain their league title despite finishing top of the table during the regular season.

Chelsea

Transfer
In August 2011, Lukaku joined Premier League club Chelsea on a five-year contract for a fee reported to be around €12 million (£10 million), rising to €20 million (£17 million) in add-ons.

2011–12: Debut season
Lukaku made his debut at Stamford Bridge in a 3–1 victory over Norwich City in the 83rd minute, coming on as a substitute for Fernando Torres. Lukaku made his first start for Chelsea in the League Cup against Fulham. Chelsea went on to win the match on penalties. He spent the majority of the season playing for the reserves and started his first Premier League match on 13 May 2012, against Blackburn Rovers, and turned in a man of the match performance, providing an assist for John Terry's opener. However, Lukaku stressed he was disappointed with his involvement at the end of his debut season, revealing that, after his side's UEFA Champions League win in the final on 19 May, he refused to hold the trophy, explaining "it wasn't me, but my team that won".

2012–13 season: Loan to West Bromwich Albion

After speculation linking Lukaku to a loan move to Fulham, on 10 August 2012, he joined West Bromwich Albion on a season-long loan deal. He scored his first league goal eight days later, coming on as a substitute in the 77th minute in a 3–0 win against Liverpool. He made his full debut in a win against Reading at The Hawthorns, scoring the match's only goal. On 24 November, Lukaku came on as a 70th-minute substitute for Shane Long and netted a penalty and provided an assist to Marc-Antoine Fortuné, as West Brom defeated Sunderland 4–2 away at the Stadium of Light. The win proved to be West Brom's fourth consecutive win in the top flight for the first time since 1980. On 12 January 2013, Lukaku had his first multi-goal game in the Premier League, giving West Brom a 2–0 lead against Reading, before a late comeback gave the Berkshire club a 3–2 victory at the Madejski Stadium. In the face of claims he wanted to stay with West Brom for another year, Lukaku confirmed to the press he still wished to become a legend at Stamford Bridge. On 11 February, Lukaku came on as a substitute and scored his tenth Premier League goal of the season against Liverpool in a match that ended 2–0.

He scored his second brace of the campaign, scoring both goals for West Brom in their 2–1 home defeat of Sunderland on 23 February. On 9 March, in a league match against Swansea City, Lukaku scored the equalising goal before having a penalty kick saved; West Brom eventually won the game courtesy of a Jonathan de Guzmán own goal. On 19 May, coming on as a second-half substitute, Lukaku scored a remarkable second-half perfect hat-trick, as West Brom came from three goals down to draw 5–5 in the season's final home match against Manchester United. The match was Alex Ferguson's 1,500th and last match in charge of United, and the highest-scoring draw in the history of the Premier League. Despite being loaned out by the club, Lukaku outscored all of his Chelsea teammates in the Premier League that season, being the sixth-highest goal scorer of the 2012–13 season with 17 goals. Lukaku played two Premier League matches for Chelsea at the beginning of the 2013–14 season. He also came on as a substitute in the 2013 UEFA Super Cup, ultimately missing the deciding penalty in the shootout as Manuel Neuer saved his shot and Chelsea lost to Bayern Munich.

2013–14 season: Loan to Everton

On the final day of the summer 2013 transfer window, Lukaku joined Everton on a season-long loan. The striker made his début for the Toffees away to West Ham United on 21 September 2013, scoring the winning goal in a 3–2 victory for Everton. During the header, he had a collision with a West Ham defender and was taken off the pitch for some treatment. The physio had to tell him he had scored the winner. He scored twice on his home debut nine days later in a 3–2 win against Newcastle United, as well assisting Ross Barkley's goal. He then opened the scoring in a 3–1 defeat to Manchester City in the following match. He continued his impressive start at the club by netting the opening goal in a 2–0 win over Aston Villa, and then scored twice in the first Merseyside derby of the season as Everton drew 3–3 against Liverpool, with Lukaku stating afterwards it was the best experience he had had in his short career.

In January 2014, Lukaku was named by The Guardian as one of the ten most promising young players in Europe, but later in the month was taken off on a stretcher with an ankle ligament injury after Gareth Barry slipped and slid into the striker as he attempted to block Steven Gerrard's opening goal in the Merseyside derby against Liverpool. Lukaku made his return from injury against West Ham in March 2014, scoring the only goal of the match on the 81st minute after coming on as a second-half substitute. On 6 April, he scored one goal and assisted another as Everton beat Arsenal 3–0 at Goodison Park to record a sixth consecutive Premier League win. His final goal for the loan period came on the last day of the season as he scored the second in a 2–0 win over Hull City. Lukaku found the net 15 times in 31 league matches to help Everton to fifth place with a club record of 72 Premier League points.

Everton

2014–16: Rise to stardom

Lukaku signed a five-year contract with Everton in July 2014 for a club record fee of £28 million. He scored his first goal as a permanent player on 13 September, against his former club West Brom. Lukaku did not celebrate the goal, and was applauded by the West Brom fans for his sign of respect. On 19 February 2015, Lukaku scored his first Everton hat-trick in a 4–1 win for Everton against BSC Young Boys in the UEFA Europa League last 32; he struck with a header, a right-foot shot and a left-foot shot. He added another two goals in a 3–1 win in the second leg a week later. With eight goals, he was the tournament's joint highest scorer that season, alongside Alan of Red Bull Salzburg.

In the second game of the 2015–16 Premier League season, Lukaku scored a first-half double in Everton's 3–0 win at Southampton on 15 August 2015 with his first two shots on target. Before the match, he presented a T-shirt to a home fan whom he had accidentally struck with the ball during shooting practice. On 26 August, he scored another brace in a 5–3 extra-time win over League One side Barnsley in the League Cup. On 28 September, Lukaku scored twice and assisted the other against West Brom as he managed to guide his team from losing 2–0 to winning 2–3. He scored against Liverpool the following week in a 1–1 draw at Goodison Park. On 21 November, Lukaku scored twice in a 4–0 win over Aston Villa, becoming the fifth player under 23 years of age to score at least 50 Premier League goals, after Robbie Fowler, Michael Owen, Wayne Rooney and Cristiano Ronaldo. On 7 December, Lukaku scored a close-range goal in a 1–1 draw against Crystal Palace, his 50th in 100 appearances in all competitions for Everton. On 12 December, Lukaku became the first Everton player to score in six consecutive Premier League matches, and the first to score in seven consecutive matches in all competitions since Bob Latchford 40 years previously, when he opened the scoring in the Toffees 1–1 draw with Norwich City at Carrow Road. In his next match, a 3–2 defeat to Leicester City, Lukaku became the first Everton player since Dave Hickson in 1954 to score in eight consecutive matches.

On 6 February 2016, Lukaku scored his 20th goal of the season in a 3–0 victory at Stoke City, meaning he was the first Everton player since Graeme Sharp to score at least 20 goals in all competitions in consecutive seasons for Everton. The strike was also his 16th league goal of the season, equalling Premier League goal scoring records for Everton set by Tony Cottee and Andrei Kanchelskis in the mid-1990s. Lukaku followed this goal with another strike in a 2–0 victory at AFC Bournemouth's Dean Court for his 21st goal of the season. This victory sent Everton into the quarter-finals of the FA Cup, and equalled the number of goals scored in all competitions by Yakubu for Everton in the 2007–08 season, the previous best in the Premier League era. On 1 March, Lukaku scored in a 3–1 victory against Aston Villa at Villa Park, his 17th league goal of the season, a Premier League-era record for Everton. The goal also meant Lukaku had equalled his previous best goal return in a league season, set during his loan spell at West Brom in the 2012–13 season.

2016–17: Sustained individual success

On 12 September 2016, Lukaku scored his first goals of the 2016–17 season with all three goals in a 3–0 against Sunderland at the Stadium of Light. His goals were scored in 11 minutes and 37 seconds, making it the 12th-fastest hat-trick in Premier League history. On 4 February 2017, Lukaku scored four goals, the first of which was Everton's fastest ever Premier League goal, against Bournemouth in a 6–3 victory at Goodison Park. It was also the 300th hat-trick scored in the Premier League. On 25 February 2017, he equalled Duncan Ferguson's club record for Premier League goals, scoring his 60th EPL goal for the Toffees in a 2–0 victory over Sunderland at Goodison Park. On 5 March, he surpassed Ferguson to become the outright record holder, scoring in a 3–2 loss against Tottenham Hotspur away at White Hart Lane. In the next match, a 3–0 home win against West Brom, Lukaku scored to become the first Everton player since Bob Latchford to score 20 or more goals in all competitions for three consecutive seasons. A week later, during a 4–0 victory over Hull City, he scored twice to take his league goals tally to 21 for the season, thereby becoming the first Everton player since Gary Lineker 31 years previously to surpass 20 league goals in a season, as well as being the fourth player and first foreign player to score 80 Premier League goals before the age of 24.

In March 2017, Lukaku turned down a new five-year contract worth a reported £140,000 a week amidst rumours of a return to Chelsea. In an interview, he questioned the club's ambition to make big transfers and chase Champions League qualification, offending his manager Ronald Koeman. A goal in a 3–1 win for Everton against Burnley on 15 April meant Lukaku was the first Everton player since Bob Latchford to score 25 goals in two consecutive seasons in all competitions, and the first player since the legendary Dixie Dean to score in nine consecutive matches at Goodison Park. On 20 April 2017, Lukaku was named in the PFA Team of the Year for the first time. He was also included in the six player shortlists for the PFA Players' Player of the Year and PFA Young Player of the Year awards.

Manchester United
Transfer
Lukaku joined Manchester United on 10 July 2017, signing a five-year contract with the option of a further year. Although the fee was officially undisclosed, it was reported to be worth an initial £75 million, plus £15 million in add-ons. Thus, he became a teammate with his French-speaking close friend Paul Pogba. Lukaku's signing came a day after former Manchester United captain Wayne Rooney left the club to return to Everton, Rooney's boyhood club.

2017–18: Debut season and drop in form

Lukaku made his debut against Real Madrid on 8 August in the 2017 UEFA Super Cup, and scored his first competitive goal for the club in a 2–1 defeat. His league debut came five days later at home to West Ham. Lukaku scored twice in a 4–0 win, becoming the fourth Manchester United player to score two goals on his Premier League debut for the club. On 12 September, he scored his first UEFA Champions League goal in a 3–0 win over FC Basel. On 17 September, Lukaku scored United's third goal in a 4–0 win over his former club Everton, with Lukaku running over towards Everton fans and cupping his ears during his goal celebration in response to being booed throughout the game.

On 27 September, Lukaku scored twice in a 4–1 win over CSKA Moscow, taking his tally to 10 goals in his first nine appearances. In doing so, he broke the record set by Bobby Charlton who had scored nine goals in his first nine appearances for the club. In a 2–1 win over his former club Chelsea on 25 February 2018, Lukaku scored the equaliser and then assisted Jesse Lingard's game-winning goal. He scored his 200th goal for club and country on 13 March in a 2–1 away defeat to Sevilla that eliminated Manchester United from the Champions League in the round of 16. On 31 March 2018, Lukaku scored to open a 2–0 home win over Swansea. It was his 100th Premier League goal in his 216th game, and made him the fifth youngest of the 28 players to reach the tally.

2018–19: Final season in Manchester
Lukaku started the 2018–19 season with four goals in his first five appearances, including a brace against Burnley, before a 12-game drought lasting from 19 September to 27 November 2018. Goals against Southampton and Fulham followed before the sacking of manager José Mourinho, only for Mourinho's replacement – former United striker Ole Gunnar Solskjær – to leave Lukaku out of the squad entirely for his first two games in charge against Cardiff City and Huddersfield Town. Lukaku made substitute appearances in United's next two games against Bournemouth and Newcastle United, scoring in both matches within two minutes of coming on. He then played the full 90 minutes of the FA Cup third round tie against Reading, scoring the second goal in a 2–0 win. However, Solskjær continued to prefer to start Marcus Rashford up front and Lukaku started just five of the next nine games, playing the full 90 minutes in just two and failing to score in any of them. His goalscoring form returned for the next three games, as he scored braces against each of Crystal Palace, Southampton and Paris Saint-Germain. The goals against PSG were part of a 3–1 win that saw United through to the Champions League quarter-finals on the away goals rule, the first time any team had progressed after losing at home in the first leg by two goals or more. However, United were eliminated by Barcelona in the quarterfinals 4–0 on aggregate.

Inter Milan
2019–20: Club record transfer
Lukaku joined Italian club Inter Milan on 8 August 2019, signing a five-year contract for a fee reported to be a club record €80 million. He later mentioned the reasons for leaving Manchester United, by claiming that he was made a scapegoat alongside other players such as Paul Pogba and Alexis Sánchez, in addition to club's failure to protect him against rumours about his future. Lukaku made his debut for Inter Milan on 26 August in the opening Serie A matchday against Lecce, netting his side's third goal with his first shot in a 4–0 home win. The goal meant that Lukaku has found the net in his first league game for five of the six clubs he has represented; Anderlecht, West Brom, Everton, Manchester United, and Inter; he also become only the third Belgian to score for Inter in Serie A, after Enzo Scifo and Radja Nainggolan. In the club's second league game of the season at Cagliari on 1 September, Lukaku scored the match-winning goal from the penalty spot to give Inter a 2–1 victory away from home; however, he was subject to racial abuse from some of the Cagliari fans.

In the first months since his arrival, Lukaku formed an attacking partnership with Argentine youngster Lautaro Martínez, dubbed "Lu-La" by Italian media. This became after the duo scored a brace each in the 4–3 away win against Sassuolo in October, giving Inter the first triumph since 2016. On 2 November, Lukaku scored a brace in a 2–1 away win over Bologna in Serie A, which saw him match Ronaldo's record of nine goals in his first 11 league appearances for the club. On 27 November, Lukaku scored his first UEFA Champions League goal for Inter in a 3–1 away win against Slavia Prague in the group stage; in addition to that, he also assisted the two other goals scored by Lautaro Martínez and had two goals disallowed himself. In the final match home against Barcelona, Lukaku scored his side's only goal in a 2–1 defeat, meaning that Inter was transferred to Europa League for the second season in a row.

He began the new year on 6 January by scoring a brace in a 3–1 win against Napoli, giving Inter the first league win at Stadio San Paolo since October 1997; he earned praise from the media for his first goal scored in the 14th minute, which came from an individual effort. On 9 February, Lukaku scored the final goal of the 4–2 home win over cross-town rivals Milan, sending Inter to the top of the table and giving them another double over Milan; it was also his 17th league goal of the season.

On 25 July, Lukaku scored a brace in a 3–0 win at Genoa; in doing so, he became the first Inter player since István Nyers in 1949–50 season to score 15 away goals in a Serie A season, and the first do to so in his debut season. He concluded his first Serie A season with 23 goals, as Inter finished runner-up by just one point to Juventus in the standings; only Ronaldo (25) and Nyers (26) have scored more than him in their debut season at Inter. On 5 August, Lukaku scored in a 2–0 win over Getafe in the Europa League's round of 16, helping his side reach the quarter-finals of a European competition for the first time since 2011. It was his 30th goal in all competitions, a new personal best, and he had also scored for the 8th consecutive Europa League match, equalling the all-time record set by Alan Shearer in 2004–05. In the quarter-finals on 10 August, he broke the record, scoring in his ninth consecutive match in the competition in a 2–1 victory over Bayer Leverkusen in Düsseldorf, to send Inter into the semi-finals. On 17 August, Lukaku scored a brace in a 5–0 win against Shakhtar Donetsk—his tenth consecutive match in the competition—as Inter reached the final. In the final, he earned and scored a penalty in the 5th minute, but also scored an own goal in the 74th minute, which was eventually the winning goal for Sevilla in a 3–2 defeat. Lukaku equalled Ronaldo's record in 1997–98 season, by scoring 34 goals in all competitions.

2020–21: Serie A champion
On 21 October 2020, Lukaku scored a brace in a 2–2 draw against Borussia Mönchengladbach in the first match of the 2020–21 UEFA Champions League. On 1 December, he scored another brace against Borussia Mönchengladbach to secure a 3–2 away win. However, Inter drew their last match against Shakhtar Donetsk, to finish last in their group and to be eliminated from all European competitions.

On 3 January 2021, Lukaku scored a goal in a 6–2 win over Crotone, to reach his 50th goal across all competitions in only 70 matches, breaking the previous record of Ronaldo who scored 50 goals in 77 matches. On 26 January, Lukaku was involved in a confrontation with former Manchester United teammate Zlatan Ibrahimović in Inter's Coppa Italia quarter-final match against Milan. Following a foul committed by Lukaku late in the first half, he and Ibrahimović could be heard exchanging insults as the pair clashed heads and had to be restrained by their respective teammates. Both players were booked as their arguments continued into the tunnel at half-time. Ibrahimović would be sent off during the second half following a second yellow for a foul on Aleksandar Kolarov, as Inter went on to record a 2–1 victory.

On 14 February, he scored a brace and got an assist against Lazio in a 3–1 victory, bringing his Serie A tally to 16 goals for the season and equalling Cristiano Ronaldo as the league's top scorer. Lukaku's second goal was also the 300th of his professional career. Inter won the 2020–21 Serie A for the first time since the 2009–10 season. Lukaku finished the season 2020–21 with 24 league goals, 11 assists. Making him the highest scorer on the title-winning team and the second highest-scorer in the league, behind Ronaldo.

Return to Chelsea
2021–22: FIFA Club World champion and loss of form

On 12 August 2021, Lukaku returned to his former club Chelsea, a decade after he had originally joined the club, for a reported club record fee of £97.5 million. In making the move, Lukaku became the most expensive player of all time with cumulative transfer fees of almost £285 million, surpassing Neymar. Lukaku admitted in an interview that he did request Inter to reach to an agreement with Chelsea stating, "I didn't want to go behind Inter's back. They got me out of the shit. I was in a deep hole at Manchester United. After training I went to [head coach Simone] Inzaghi's office. I didn't want to ruin the atmosphere because I was no longer with my head in Milan. So I asked him: Please find an agreement."

On 22 August, Lukaku scored on his second debut in the 15th minute, converting Reece James' cross, in a 2–0 away win over Arsenal. On 12 September, Lukaku scored twice at home against Aston Villa, the first time he had scored at Stamford Bridge. Two days later, Lukaku scored his first European goal for Chelsea, against Zenit in the Champions League. On 8 October, Lukaku was one of five Chelsea players included in the final 30-man shortlist for the 2021 Ballon d'Or, eventually finishing 12th.

In late December, Lukaku stoked controversy when during an interview with Sky Italia, he reported being "not happy" with the situation at Chelsea, and that head coach Thomas Tuchel "has chosen to play with another system" comparing the teams tactics with that at Inter Milan. In the same interview, he went on to express his wish to return to Inter "in the near future". Consequently, Tuchel dropped him from the squad altogether for a match against title challengers Liverpool, which ended 2–2. After then holding talks with Tuchel, Lukaku issued an apology, saying "I'm sorry for the upset I have caused" and stated that he "wanted to move forward". He was restored to the first team and started in the first leg of the EFL Cup semi-final win against Tottenham Hotspur, but was fined for his comments. Lukaku finished the season having scored eight goals in 26 league games; he was judged by ESPN to be the worst signing of the Premier League season.

2022–23: Return to Inter Milan (loan)
On 29 June 2022, Chelsea announced that Lukaku would return to Inter for a season long loan for the 2022–23 campaign. It was reported that the Italian side agreed to pay a loan fee of approximately €8 million (£6.9 million), and that Lukaku took a pay cut.

International career

Lukaku was a member of the Belgium under-21 team and scored a goal on his debut against Slovenia. On 24 February 2010, Lukaku was named for the first time in the Belgium senior squad for a friendly against Croatia. On 17 November 2010, he scored his first two international goals in a friendly against Russia. Lukaku scored his first goal in almost two years for the national team, netting the winner in a 4–2 friendly victory over rivals the Netherlands on 15 August 2012.

On 11 October 2013, Lukaku scored two goals as Belgium defeated Croatia 2–1 to secure a place in the World Cup finals. In May 2014, Lukaku was named in Belgium's squad for the 2014 World Cup. On 26 May, he scored his first international hat-trick in a pre-tournament friendly against neighbouring Luxembourg. However, as Belgium made seven substitutions during this match instead of the permitted six, it was not recognised as an official match by FIFA. On 1 June, he scored first of Belgium's two goals in the 2–0 victory in a friendly against Sweden. In Belgium's first match of the tournament, a 2–1 win against Algeria in Belo Horizonte, Lukaku started and played 58 minutes before being replaced by Divock Origi. In the round of 16, Lukaku came on as a substitute prior to extra time and assisted Kevin De Bruyne's opening goal three minutes later. In the 105th minute, he scored his first goal of the tournament as Belgium defeated the United States 2–1.

On 29 March 2016, Lukaku headed a consolation in a 2–1 loss away to Portugal, assisted by his brother, Jordan Lukaku. At UEFA Euro 2016, Lukaku scored twice in Belgium's 3–0 second group stage match win on 18 June 2016 over the Republic of Ireland.

On 10 November 2017, Lukaku equalled the all-time Belgium goalscoring record set by Bernard Voorhoof and Paul Van Himst after scoring twice against Mexico in a 3–3 draw. Four days after he equalled the record, Lukaku became Belgium's all-time record goalscorer with 31 international goals at the age of 24 after he scored the only goal in a 1–0 win over Japan. Although this record was counted by the Royal Belgian Football Association, FIFA only officially recognised 28 goals after a nullified international friendly against Luxembourg on 26 May 2014 which he netted a hat trick in a 5–1 win because the former Belgium coach, Marc Wilmots made seven substitutions during the match instead of the permitted six which are not in accordance to the Laws of the Game.

On 6 June 2018, Lukaku officially became Belgium's all-time leading scorer with 31 goals after scoring a goal in a 3–0 win over Egypt. He also broke a three-way tie with the previous record goalscorers, Bernard Voorhoof and Paul Van Himst.

On 18 June, Lukaku scored twice in a 3–0 win over Panama in their opening group game at the 2018 FIFA World Cup. In the next group game on 23 June 2018, he scored twice again in a 5–2 win over Tunisia. In doing so, Lukaku became the first player since Diego Maradona in 1986 to score two goals or more in consecutive World Cup matches. He eventually ended the tournament with four goals and one assist, which earned him the Bronze Boot award, as Belgium finished the tournament in third place.

On 10 October 2019, Lukaku scored his 50th and 51st international goals in a 9–0 home win over San Marino, in a Euro 2020 qualifier. On 12 June 2021, Lukaku scored twice in Belgium's opening group match of UEFA Euro 2020, a 3–0 win over Russia. On 21 June, he scored the last goal in a 2–0 win over Finland in his team's final group match. On 2 July, he scored Belgium's only goal of the match from a penalty late in the first half in a 2–1 defeat to Italy in the quarter-finals of the competition. Two days after the final Lukaku was awarded as sole Belgian player with a selection for the UEFA Euro 2020 Team of the Tournament. He got the striker position.

Lukaku made his 100th Belgium appearance on 5 September 2021 against the Czech Republic, scoring his 67th goal in the process.

Style of play
Lukaku is a left-footed player, who in 2014 was named by The Guardian as one of the ten most promising young players in Europe. A large and physically powerful striker from an early age, with an eye for goal, Lukaku has been known to use his physicality to get around defenders. However, despite his size, strength, physical build, and ability to hold-up play with his back to goal, his favoured role is not as a target-man in the centre, but as an out-and-out striker or poacher; due to his tactical versatility, he is also capable of playing as a winger. A well-rounded forward, who is also strong in the air, beyond his physical qualities and goalscoring ability, he possesses pace, athleticism, awareness, good link-up play, technical attributes, and vision, as well as an ability to get into good attacking positions or create space for teammates with his intelligent runs off the ball. Although he was once criticised by pundits for his limited defensive contribution, he has since been praised by his managers for his work-rate off the ball. However, despite his ability, he has also come into criticism in the media at times over his movement and first touch.

Influences
In a 2016 interview with ESPN, Lukaku named Didier Drogba and Nicolas Anelka as the two strikers who made him want to play for Chelsea, but it was the mention of a third striker during the interview, his idol Ronaldo, that lit him up with excitement, with Lukaku stating,

Crediting the former Brazilian striker as his major influence as a kid, Lukaku added, "He changed the dimension of a striker. He was fast, he can dribble like a winger, run like a sprinter, he was as strong as an ox". When mentioned that he shares certain characteristics with the Brazilian, Lukaku responded, "Be like Ronaldo? There is only one Ronaldo".

Personal life
Lukaku was born in Antwerp, Belgium to Congolese parents. His father, Roger Lukaku, played professional football and was capped at international level by Zaire. He has a younger brother named Jordan, who has progressed through the youth academy at Anderlecht and currently plays for Royal Antwerp in Belgium. His cousin Boli Bolingoli-Mbombo plays as a left-sided winger or defender for Mechelen.

Lukaku was the subject of a television documentary series called De School Van Lukaku (Lukaku's School) shown on the Dutch-speaking Eén network. The reality show followed the teenage Lukaku and his classmates during the course of a year at the Saint-Guidon Institute, a school in Brussels, where the footballer was based while with the Anderlecht youth team. In 2009, the series followed the school as it made a field trip to London, visiting Chelsea's Stamford Bridge ground. Lukaku said at the time, "What a stadium. If one day in my life I will cry, it will be the day I play here. I love Chelsea." In addition to his native French and Dutch, Lukaku can speak fluent English, Portuguese, Italian, Spanish and a Congolese Swahili dialect, and can also understand German. Lukaku has stated his biggest idol was Didier Drogba.

Lukaku is a practising Catholic, praying frequently before or after matches. He made the pilgrimage to Lourdes in 2014. He is teetotal.

Media and endorsements
Lukaku was the first Premier League player to join Jay-Z's management agency Roc Nation Sports. In 2018, he signed a record sponsorship deal with German sportswear company Puma, the company's largest endorsement deal ever.

Activism

Lukaku has spoken out against racism he suffered while playing football, particularly the 2019–20 Serie A season, his first year playing in Italy.

In 2020, Lukaku honoured George Floyd by kneeling and keeping one fist high in support of Black Lives Matter when he scored in a game with Inter against Sampdoria. This symbolic action was inspired by American football player Colin Kaepernick who kneeled during the national anthem before every game in 2016 as a peaceful manner of protest against police brutality towards people of colour. Since then, Lukaku and other players in Europe has taken an active role to take a knee on the pitches.

In 2021, Lukaku said he's fighting "against all forms of discrimination, whether religious, linked to skin color, [or] sexual".

Career statistics
Club

International

HonoursAnderlechtBelgian Pro League: 2009–10Inter MilanSerie A: 2020–21
Supercoppa Italiana: 2022
UEFA Europa League runner-up: 2019–20ChelseaFIFA Club World Cup: 2021
FA Cup runner-up: 2021–22
EFL Cup runner-up: 2021–22BelgiumFIFA World Cup third place: 2018Individual'
IFFHS World's Best International Goal Scorer: 2020
Belgian Sportsman Promising Talent of the Year: 2009
Belgian Bronze Shoe: 2009
Belgian Silver Shoe: 2010
Ebony Shoe: 2011
Everton Young Player of the Season: 2015–16
Everton Goal of the Season: 2015–16
Premier League Player of the Month: March 2017
PFA Team of the Year: 2016–17 Premier League
Everton Player of the Season: 2016–17
Everton Players' Player of the Season: 2016–17
PFA Fans' Player of the Month: August/September 2017
FIFA World Cup Bronze Boot: 2018
Italian Football Hall of Fame (Davide Astori Fair Play Award): 2019
Premio internazionale Giacinto Facchetti: 2020
UEFA European Championship Team of the Tournament: 2020
UEFA Europa League Squad of the Season: 2019–20
UEFA Europa League Player of the Season: 2019–20
Serie A Player of the Month: February 2021
Serie A Most Valuable Player: 2020–21
UEFA Nations League top scorer: 2020–21
Best Belgian Abroad: 2020, 2021
Serie A Team of the Year: 2020–21
Serie A Footballer of the Year: 2021
Ballon d'Or nomination: 2021

Notes

See also

 List of men's footballers with 50 or more international goals
 List of men's footballers with 100 or more international caps

References

External links

Profile at the Chelsea F.C. website

1993 births
Living people
Belgian people of Democratic Republic of the Congo descent
Belgian Roman Catholics
Black Belgian sportspeople
Footballers from Antwerp
Belgian footballers
Association football forwards
K. Rupel Boom F.C. players
R.S.C. Anderlecht players
Chelsea F.C. players
West Bromwich Albion F.C. players
Everton F.C. players
Manchester United F.C. players
Inter Milan players
Belgian Pro League players
Premier League players
Serie A players
FA Cup Final players
Belgium youth international footballers
Belgium under-21 international footballers
Belgium international footballers
2014 FIFA World Cup players
UEFA Euro 2016 players
2018 FIFA World Cup players
UEFA Euro 2020 players
2022 FIFA World Cup players
FIFA Century Club
Belgian expatriate footballers
Expatriate footballers in England
Expatriate footballers in Italy
Belgian expatriate sportspeople in England
Belgian expatriate sportspeople in Italy